For the river in Fort Bend and Brazoria Counties, Texas see: Oyster Creek (Texas).

Oyster Creek is a city in Brazoria County, Texas, United States. The population was 1,111 at the 2010 census.

Geography

Oyster Creek is located at  (28.998521, –95.325062), partially bounded on the north by its eponymous stream.

Demographics

At the 2000 census there were 1,192 people in 440 households, including 304 families, in the city. The population density was 629.1 people per square mile (243.5/km). There were 527 housing units at an average density of 278.1/sq mi (107.7/km).  The racial makeup of the city was 87.00% White, 3.61% African American, 1.59% Native American, 0.42% Asian, 5.29% from other races, and 2.10% from two or more races. Hispanic or Latino of any race were 16.86%.

Of the 440 households 32.7% had children under the age of 18 living with them, 53.0% were married couples living together, 10.0% had a female householder with no husband present, and 30.9% were non-families. 23.4% of households were one person and 10.2% were one person aged 65 or older. The average household size was 2.64 and the average family size was 3.14.

The age distribution was 30.2% under the age of 18, 8.6% from 18 to 24, 28.5% from 25 to 44, 22.0% from 45 to 64, and 10.7% 65 or older. The median age was 33 years. For every 100 females, there were 104.5 males. For every 100 females age 18 and over, there were 102.4 males.

The median household income was $35,144 and the median family income  was $38,676. Males had a median income of $35,000 versus $18,750 for females. The per capita income for the city was $15,000. About 14.2% of families and 19.2% of the population were below the poverty line, including 29.5% of those under age 18 and 15.0% of those age 65 or over.

Education 

The city is served by the Brazosport Independent School District.
 Freeport Elementary School (grades Pre-K–1)
 Velasco Elementary School (grades 2–4)
 Lanier Middle School (grades 5–6)
 Freeport Intermediate School (grades 7–8)
 Brazosport High School (grades 9–12)

Previously in terms of elementary grades it was entirely zoned to Velasco Elementary, which previously served grades Pre-K–4. In 2017, there was a realignment with Velasco Elementary becoming a grade 2–4 school for the area, while O. A. Eleming Elementary became a Pre-K–1 school. Fleming was scheduled to close when the new Freeport Elementary School opened in 2018.

The city is also served by Brazosport College. The Texas Legislature designated the Brazosport ISD as in the Brazosport College zone.

The city is served by the Brazoria County Library System.

References

External links
 Handbook of Texas Online article on Oyster Creek

Cities in Brazoria County, Texas
Cities in Texas
Greater Houston